Kilroy Was Here is a 1947 American comedy film directed by Phil Karlson and written by Dick Irving Hyland. The film stars Jackie Cooper, Jackie Coogan, Wanda McKay, Frank Jenks, Norman Phillips Jr. and Rand Brooks. The film was released on July 19, 1947, by Monogram Pictures.

Plot

Cast          
Jackie Cooper as John J. Kilroy
Jackie Coogan as Pappy Collins
Wanda McKay as Connie Harcourt
Frank Jenks as Butch Miller
Norman Phillips Jr. as Elmer Hatch 
Rand Brooks as Rodney Meadows
Barton Yarborough as Prof. Thomas Shepherd
Frank J. Scannell as 1st Cab Driver 
Patti Brill as Marge Connors
Robert Coogan as Soldier Cheer Leader
Joseph Forte as College Registrar 
Sid Melton as Joe 
Pat Goldin as Waiter 
Raymond Largay as Dean Butler
Gil Stratton as Jimmy White
William Edwin Self as Murdock
Therese Lyon as Mother Dunlap 
Allen Mathews as Mike
Eric Sinclair as Dick 
Jimmy Clark as Richard 
Gregg Barton as Guard
Phil Arnold as Sugar Bowl Proprietor
Nita Bieber as Waitress
Stumpy Brown as Shorty
George Hickman as Jack

References

External links
 

1947 films
American comedy films
1947 comedy films
Monogram Pictures films
Films directed by Phil Karlson
American black-and-white films
1940s English-language films
1940s American films
English-language comedy films